Mauricio Aníbal Isla Isla (born 12 June 1988) is a Chilean professional footballer who plays as a right-back and midfielder for Chilean Primera División club Universidad Católica and the Chile national team.

Isla started his career in the youth system of Universidad Católica, and later moved to Italian club Udinese in 2007, where he made his professional debut. His performances earned him a transfer to defending Serie A Champions Juventus where he won consecutive league titles during his first two seasons with the team. In 2014, he was sent on loan for a season to English side Queens Park Rangers, while he also spent the next season on  loan with French club Marseille.

Isla has earned over 130 caps for Chile since his debut in 2007, and represented the nation in two FIFA World Cups (in 2010 and 2014) as well as five Copa América tournaments (in 2011, 2015, 2016, 2019 and 2021), winning the 2015 and 2016 editions.

Club career

Early years
As a child, Isla was with Huracán de Maipo from Buin. Next, he started in the youth ranks of Universidad Católica in 1999 as a forward. However his lack of height caused him to switch positions to defender, as U Católica lacked quality youth defenders. Isla played well enough in the new position to earn a call-up to the first team in 2006, but never played an official match and in 2007, coach José del Solar sent him back to the youth team.

Udinese

Isla had a notable performance during the summer of 2007 in the 2007 FIFA U-20 World Cup in Canada and was thereafter signed by Udinese of the Serie A in Italy on a five-year contract. He can both defend and attack and has been known to turn innocent possession-based games into quick-paced counter-attacks with ease. His technique is well accompanied by a surprising pace and stamina.

Isla made his professional debut on 19 December 2007 versus Palermo in the Coppa Italia. On 8 March 2008, Isla played his first game as a starter in Serie A also against Palermo, a game which ended in a 1–1 draw. After the departure of Simone Pepe, Isla often played as a right wing-back in a 3–5–2 formation during Udinese's 2010–11 Serie A campaign, due to a long-term injury to Dušan Basta. In that season, he was instrumental in helping Udinese finish fourth, thus gaining qualification to the 2011–12 UEFA Champions League play-off round.

Juventus
On 15 June 2012, Juventus announced Isla's arrival to a medical ahead of a prospective move to join the team for the upcoming 2012–13 season. Following his move to Juventus, Isla said moving to Juventus was his dream come true and that he was excited to join his Chilean team-mate Arturo Vidal. Isla told TVN:This is a dream come true: We are going to be the strongest team in Italy. It is important for me as a player, but it is also vital for my family. I have been working for years to get to this point. In Udine I became a professional. But I have always said that sooner or later I would go to a bigger club like Juve. There I can challenge for trophies. I want to play and win something important, like the Champions League.

Loan to Queens Park Rangers
On 6 August 2014, Isla joined Queens Park Rangers on loan for the 2014–15 Premier League season, with an option of a permanent deal at the end of the season for a reported £8 million fee.
He made his debut away against Tottenham Hotspur.
He made his home debut in the next league game against Sunderland, adapting to a new right-back role in a changed formation, helping the R's to their first league win and clean sheet of the season.
Isla adapted quickly to the Premier League and this was helped when he was joined at QPR by his national teammate and close friend Eduardo Vargas, who plays just in front of him in QPR's 4–4–2 formation. This started to show when he provided an assist for Charlie Austin against reigning Premier League champions Manchester City.
After settling into life in West London, Isla signaled his intention to take up the option of making the loan permanent at the end of the season.

Later years
On 31 August 2015 Isla was loaned to Marseille by Juventus.

On 10 August 2016, Isla moved to Cagliari for a transfer fee of €4 million. He signed a three-year contract with his new club.

On 21 July 2017, Isla signed for Turkish side Fenerbahçe on a three-year contract for an undisclosed fee.

Flamengo
On 19 August 2020, Isla signed for Brazilian club Flamengo a two and a half-year contract on a free transfer. Isla debuted for Flamengo on 30 August 2020 as a halftime substitute in a Campeonato Brasileiro Série A 1–0 win over Santos at Vila Belmiro. He was named the best right back in the league during the 2020 season as Flamengo won the league title.

Return to Chile 
On 21 June 2022, Universidad Católica announced the signing of Isla on a two and a half-year contract on a free transfer.

International career

Youth
Isla took part with Chile at under-15 level in the 2004 South American Championship and with Chile U17 in the 2005 South American Championship.

2007 FIFA U-20 World Cup
Isla took part with Chile U20 in the 2007 South American Youth Championship, where Chile qualified for the 2007 FIFA U-20 World Cup. During the U-20 World Cup Isla was noticed worldwide for his skill with the ball and versatility. Isla was an integral part of the team that finished in third place. In the quarterfinal game versus Nigeria, Isla played defender, midfield, and forward due to a number of injuries to other squad members. The game went into extra time after finishing scoreless in regulation and in the added time, Chile scored four goals. Two of the goals came from Isla, one from the penalty spot. After each goal Isla ran over to the Chilean telecast camera (which was marked by a Chilean flag) and dedicated his goals to his grandmother and aunt, who was pregnant. This tournament and his performance in it led Isla to be transferred to Serie A team Udinese before his professional debut in the Chilean league, a very rare occurrence.

Senior
New Chilean coach Marcelo Bielsa called Isla up at the age of 19 for his first full Chile senior squad international cap in September 2007 in a friendly against Switzerland versus his club-mate Gökhan Inler. He started as a center midfielder. This was his debut as a professional player, before making his first team debut on Udinese. His strong performances earned another call-up in the next friendly against Israel, where he came on as a second-half substitute. He played his first 2010 FIFA World Cup qualification match in March 2009 as a starter versus Peru. Isla made another start against Uruguay where, in a scoreless draw, he was sent off after 33 minutes following two yellow cards. He was a starter in all of Chile's four 2010 World Cup games. He also played in 3 of 4 matches in the 2011 Copa América, and playing in 13 of 16 matches in the 2014 FIFA World Cup qualification.

At the 2015 Copa América on home soil, Isla scored the only goal in the 81st minute of a quarter-final win over holders Uruguay at the Estadio Nacional, putting Chile into the last four for the first time since 1999, as the team went on to win the tournament.

Career statistics

Club

International

International goals
Scores and results list Chile's goal tally first.

Style of play
A hard-working, elegant, and tactically versatile player, Isla plays mainly on the right flank as a wing-back, but he can also play in numerous other positions in defence, including as a full-back or even as a midfielder, both in the centre and on the right wing; he has also been deployed in defensive and offensive midfield roles. This is possible due to his stamina, technique, strength, and pace.

Honours

Club
Juventus
Serie A: 2012–13, 2013–14
Supercoppa Italiana: 2013, 2015

Flamengo
Campeonato Brasileiro Série A: 2020
Supercopa do Brasil: 2021
Campeonato Carioca: 2021

International
Chile
Copa América: 2015, 2016

Individual
Copa América Team of the Tournament: 2016, 2021
Bola de Prata: 2020

See also
List of footballers with 100 or more caps

References

External links

Profile at La Gazzetta dello Sport 

1988 births
Living people
People from Maipo Province
Chilean footballers
Chile international footballers
Chile under-20 international footballers
Chile youth international footballers
Chilean expatriate footballers
Chilean expatriate sportspeople in Italy
Chilean expatriate sportspeople in England
Chilean expatriate sportspeople in France
Chilean expatriate sportspeople in Turkey
Chilean expatriate sportspeople in Brazil
Association football midfielders
Expatriate footballers in Italy
Expatriate footballers in England
Expatriate footballers in France
Expatriate footballers in Turkey
Expatriate footballers in Brazil
2010 FIFA World Cup players
2011 Copa América players
2014 FIFA World Cup players
2015 Copa América players
Copa América Centenario players
2017 FIFA Confederations Cup players
2019 Copa América players
2021 Copa América players
Copa América-winning players
Serie A players
Premier League players
Ligue 1 players
Süper Lig players
Campeonato Brasileiro Série A players
Udinese Calcio players
Juventus F.C. players
Queens Park Rangers F.C. players
Olympique de Marseille players
Cagliari Calcio players
Fenerbahçe S.K. footballers
CR Flamengo footballers
Club Deportivo Universidad Católica footballers
FIFA Century Club